Arturo Chini Ludueña (name also spelled Artur Quini Ludueña; October 21, 1904 – 1993) was an Argentine professional footballer who played as a striker. He held Italian citizenship and played for the Italian national B team.

He played for 5 seasons (115 games, 34 goals) in the Serie A for A.S. Roma.

His nickname was "L'avvocato" ("The Lawyer") as he had a degree in law.

1904 births
1993 deaths
Argentine footballers
Italian footballers
Serie A players
Newell's Old Boys footballers
A.S. Roma players
S.S. Alba-Audace Roma players
Association football forwards
Sportspeople from Santa Fe Province